Kai Koreniuk (born 1 March 1998) is a footballer. Born in the United States, he has represented both the United States and Netherlands internationally.

Club career
Koreniuk played varsity soccer for Seabreeze High School in Daytona Beach, Florida in 2012-13 before moving to the Netherlands the following summer. He made his Eerste Divisie debut for Jong AZ on 25 August 2017 in a game against RKC Waalwijk.

On 7 March 2019, Koreniuk joined USL Championship side LA Galaxy II.

Koreniuk appeared for LA Galaxy's first-team on 23 July 2019, during a 2019 Leagues Cup fixture against Club Tijuana.

On 25 June 2020, Koreniuk moved permanently to LA Galaxy's first team roster. Following the 2021 season, Koreniuk was released by the Galaxy.

International career
Koreniuk was born in the United States to an American father and Dutch mother. He was raised in the United States, and move to the Netherlands as a teenager to further his career. He has represented both countries as a youth international.

Career statistics

Club

References

External links
 
 Kai Koreniuk Interview

1998 births
Living people
People from Ormond Beach, Florida
Dutch footballers
Netherlands youth international footballers
American soccer players
United States men's youth international soccer players
Dutch people of American descent
American people of Dutch descent
Association football forwards
Eerste Divisie players
LA Galaxy II players
LA Galaxy players
Soccer players from Florida
USL Championship players
Major League Soccer players